The 2020–21 New Amsterdam FC season was the club's first professional season and its first in the National Independent Soccer Association.

Roster

Players

Staff

Friendlies

Competitions

NISA Independent Cup 

New Amsterdam was announced as one of the four NISA teams taking part in the inaugural NISA Independent Cup on July 1. The regional tournament acted as both a pre-season and chance to "provide a platform for professional and amateur independent clubs to play together on a national stage."

Amsterdam was drawn into the Mid-Atlantic Region alongside fellow NISA expansion side New York Cosmos, Fall 2019 UPSL champion Maryland Bobcats FC, and NPSL side FC Baltimore Christos.

On July 24, NISA announced that the Mid-Atlantic Region tournament was postponed due to a surge of COVID-19 cases in Maryland and the subsequent closing of the Maryland SoccerPlex to professional sports. On July 28, NISA announced a majority of the region's games would be played at Evergreen Sportsplex in Leesburg, Virginia with the sole exception being New Amsterdam's opening match against the Cosmos on August 2, which was played at Hudson Sports Complex in Warwick, New York.

Standings

Matches

NISA Fall Season 

On June 4, NISA announced details for the 2020 Fall Season. The eight member teams would be split into conferences, Eastern and Western, with New Amsterdam playing in the former.

The Fall regular season schedule was announced on July 31, 2020.

Standings

Results summary

Matches

Fall Playoffs

All eight NISA teams qualified for the 2020 Fall tournament, which will be hosted at Keyworth Stadium in Detroit, Michigan, beginning on September 21 ending with the final on October 2.

Group stage

NISA Spring Season

NISA Legends Cup 
NISA announced initial season plans in early February 2021, including starting the season with a tournament in Chattanooga, Tennessee with a standard regular season to follow. The tournament, now called the NISA Legends Cup, was officially announced on March 10 and is scheduled to run between April 13 and 25. All nine NISA members teams take part in the Spring will be divided into three team groups. The highest placing group winner would automatically qualify for the tournament final, while the second and third highest group winners would play one-another in a semifinal to determine a second finalist.

New Amsterdam were drawn into Group 3 alongside Los Angeles Force and Chattanooga FC.

Standings

Group 1 results

Matches

Regular season 
The Spring Season schedule was announced on March 18 with each association member playing eight games, four home and four away, in a single round-robin format.

Standings

Results summary

Matches

U.S. Open Cup 

As a team playing in a recognized professional league, New Amsterdam would normally be automatically qualified for the U.S. Open Cup. However, with the 2021 edition shorted due to the COVID-19 pandemic, NISA has only been allotted 1 to 2 teams spots. On March 29, U.S. Soccer announced 2020 Fall Champion Detroit City FC as NISA's representative in the tournament.

Squad statistics

Appearances and goals 

|-
! colspan="18" style="background:#dcdcdc; text-align:center"| Goalkeepers

|-
! colspan="18" style="background:#dcdcdc; text-align:center"| Defenders

|-
! colspan="18" style="background:#dcdcdc; text-align:center"| Midfielders

|-
! colspan="18" style="background:#dcdcdc; text-align:center"| Forwards

|-
! colspan="18" style="background:#dcdcdc; text-align:center"| Left during season

|-
|}

Goal scorers

Disciplinary record

Notes

References

External links 

 

New Amsterdam FC
New Amsterdam FC
New Amsterdam FC
New Amsterdam FC